Alice Catherine Dinnean (born May 23, 1969) is an American puppeteer, voice actress and creative writer who works at The Jim Henson Company. Dinnean has performed on many children's television shows such as The Puzzle Place, Sesame Street, Bear in the Big Blue House, Cousin Skeeter, Jim Henson's Pajanimals, Sid the Science Kid and Jack's Big Music Show. She also did work on various non-Muppet productions such as Buffy the Vampire Slayer and Angel.

Career
Her interest in puppetry began when she received a pig puppet as a prize for winning a local essay contest in Oakland, California. Following her studies at Oberlin College, she interned at the Puppetry Arts in Atlanta, Georgia. In the early 1990s, she was employed with the Jim Henson Company where she performed characters for the children's TV series, Sesame Street. Some of her characters are Sherry Netherland, the owner of the Furry Arms Hotel, and Phoebe, a member of the Monster Clubhouse, from 2001 to 2003.

Non-Muppet productions in which she has performed include the horror-humor TV series, Buffy the Vampire Slayer. On the show, she performed as a demon puppet in As You Were and a living mummy hand in Life Serial. After the series ended in 2003, Dinnean performed the puppet-like character of Angel in the episode Smile Time along with Drew Massey.

Dinnean (as Alice Dinnean-Vernon) performed Mary on the Emmy-winning children's series, Jack's Big Music Show, created by Sesame Street puppeteer David Rudman.

In 2007, she wrote episodes and performed characters on the Disney Junior's children's show, Bunnytown. She performed Cowbella in the music videos on the Sprout channel's show, Pajanimals. Her residence is in Laurel Canyon, Los Angeles, California.

From September 8–10, 2017, she was an additional Muppet performer for a live show at the Hollywood Bowl titled The Muppets Take the Bowl. Dinnean was the only Muppet performer from Bowl not to perform in The Muppets Take the O2 in London, essentially replaced in the cast by Tyler Bunch.

Filmography
 Sesame Street - Goldilocks, Phoebe, Mama Bear, Little Murray Sparkles, Sherry Netherland (1995-1998), Additional Muppets
 The Puzzle Place - Julie Woo, Sizzle 
 Bear in the Big Blue House - Grandma Flutter (1997-1998)
 Kermit's Swamp Years - Vicki, Additional Muppets
 Jack's Big Music Show - Mary 
 Sid the Science Kid - Gabriela Cordova
 The Country Bears - Beary Barrington (face puppeteer)
 The Muppets (TV series) - Alynda
 123 Count with Me - Sherry Netherland
 Kids for Character - Julie Woo
 The Happytime Murders - Sheila
 Pajanimals - Cowbella
 Muppet Babies Play Date - Summer Penguin (puppeteer only)
 The Dark Crystal: Age of Resistance - Gelflings Brea, Maudra Fara, and Bobb'N (puppeteer)
 The Dark Crystal: Age of Resistance - The Ornamentalist (skekEkt) (puppeteer and voice)

References

External links
 

Living people
American puppeteers
American television writers
1969 births
Sesame Street Muppeteers
Muppet performers